Port Loko District is a district in the North West Province of Sierra Leone. It is the most populous District in the North and the second most populous District in Sierra Leone, after the Western Area Urban District. As of the 2015 census, Port Loko District has a population of 614,063.  The district capital is the town of Port Loko and its largest city is Lunsar. The other major towns in the district include Masiaka, Rokupr, Pepel, Lungi and Gbinti.

The district of Port Loko borders the Western Area to the west, Kambia District to the north, Bombali District to the east and Tonkolili District to the south. The population of Port Loko District is predominantly Muslim and the Temne people form by far the largest ethnic group in the district.

Religion

Notable people from Port Loko District
 Alie Koblo Queen Kabia II, 44th Paramount Chief of Marampa Chiefdom.
Bai Bureh, Sierra Leonean ruler who led the Temne uprising against the British in The 1898 Rebellion
Bai Koblo Pathbana II , 43rd Paramount Chief of Marampa Chiefdom.
Sorie Ibrahim Koroma, Vice President of Sierra Leone from 1971 to 1985
Abass Bundu, Sierra Leonean Politician
Ibrahim Kemoh Sesay, Former Sierra Leone's minister of Transportation and Aviation
Amadu Wurie, Sierra Leonean Educationist and Politician
Abou Bai-Sheka, Sierra Leonean Professor

Notes

Sources
"Members of Parliament".State House Online.Office of the Sierra Leone President.Web

 
Districts of Sierra Leone
North West Province, Sierra Leone